Statistics of Swedish football Division 3 for the 1994 season.

League standings

Norra Norrland 1994

Mellersta Norrland 1994

Södra Norrland 1994

Norra Svealand 1994

Östra Svealand 1994

Västra Svealand 1994

Nordöstra Götaland 1994

Nordvästra Götaland 1994

Mellersta Götaland 1994

Sydöstra Götaland 1994

Sydvästra Götaland 1994

Södra Götaland 1994

Footnotes

References 

Swedish Football Division 3 seasons
4
Sweden
Sweden